Kirsten Nieuwendam (born August 26, 1991 in Paramaribo) is a Surinamese athlete, who attended St. Thomas Aquinas High School in Fort Lauderdale, Florida, and currently attends Pennsylvania State University in State College, Pennsylvania. Nieuwendam broke the national Women's 200 metres record at the 2008 Summer Olympics with a time of 24.46 seconds, despite being eliminated in the first round. She competed in the Women's 200 metres event at the 2012 Summer Olympics, but ranked 46th and was again eliminated in the first round.

See also
List of Pennsylvania State University Olympians

References

Living people
Olympic athletes of Suriname
Surinamese female sprinters
Athletes (track and field) at the 2008 Summer Olympics
Athletes (track and field) at the 2012 Summer Olympics
Pan American Games competitors for Suriname
Athletes (track and field) at the 2007 Pan American Games
World Athletics Championships athletes for Suriname
Sportspeople from Paramaribo
Penn State Nittany Lions women's track and field athletes
1991 births
St. Thomas Aquinas High School (Florida) alumni
Olympic female sprinters